The Norwegian Women's Curling Championship is the national championship of women's curling in Norway. It has been held annually since 1979. It is organized by the Norwegian Curling Association.

List of champions and medallists
(Team line-up in order: skip (marked bold), third, second, lead, alternate(s), coach)

References

See also
Norwegian Men's Curling Championship
Norwegian Mixed Curling Championship
Norwegian Mixed Doubles Curling Championship
Norwegian Junior Curling Championships

Women's curling competitions in Norway
National curling championships
Recurring sporting events established in 1979
1979 establishments in Norway
Curling